Rufe may refer to:

People
 Rufus Travis Amis (1912-2007), American entrepreneur
 Rufus Rufe Clarke (1900-1983), American Major League Baseball pitcher
 Rufe Davis (1908-1974), American actor
 James Ruffus Rufe Gentry (1918-1997), American Major League Baseball pitcher
 Henry "Rufe" Johnson (1908-1974), American Piedmont blues guitarist, pianist, singer and songwriter
 Rufe Persful (1906-1991), American criminal
 Wilmer R. Waters (1914-1995), American politician
 Cynthia M. Rufe (born 1948), United States District Court judge

Other uses
 Allied World War II reporting name for the Nakajima A6M2-N Japanese floatplane
 Rufe, Oklahoma, United States, an unincorporated community

Lists of people by nickname
Hypocorisms